Shem Delaney is an Irish retired hurler who played as a right corner-back for the Kilkenny senior team.

Born in Johnstown, County Kilkenny, Deelaney first arrived on the inter-county scene when he first linked up with the Kilkenny senior team during the 1974 championship. Delenay was an unused substitute during that championship campaign, however, he did win a set of All-Ireland and Leinster medals.

At club level Delaney is a one-time Leinster medallist with Fenians. In addition to this he has also won four championship medals.

Delaney's brother, Pat Delaney, and his brother-in-law, Billy Fitzpatrick, and won nine All-Ireland medals between them between 1969 and 1983. His nephew, P. J. Delaney, won an All-Ireland medal in 1993, while his son J. J. Delaney has enjoyed numerous All-Ireland successes.

Delaney retired from inter-county hurling after the 1974 championship.

Honours

Team

Fenians
Leinster Senior Club Hurling Championship (1): 1974
Kilkenny Senior Hurling Championship (4): 1970, 1972, 1973, 1977

Kilkenny
All-Ireland Senior Hurling Championship (1): 1974 (sub)
Leinster Senior Hurling Championship (1): 1974 (sub)

References

Living people
Hurling backs
Fenians hurlers
Kilkenny inter-county hurlers
Year of birth missing (living people)